Hamilton Revelle (31 May 1867 – 11 April 1958) was a British-born stage and later silent screen actor.

Biography
He was born Arthur Lloyd Hamilton Engstrom at Moorish Castle in Gibraltar, an overseas territory of the United Kingdom. His parents were George Lloyd Engström, an officer in the Royal Horse Artillery, and his wife Louisa Maria Revell.

Revelle famously was arrested on 5 March 1900, along with his female co-star Olga Nethersole, for performing the play Sapho which was considered salacious for the time for its depiction of a woman who has love affairs with men to whom she is not married. Their theatre was padlocked by the New York Police. Two plays replaced Sapho, The Second Mrs. Tanqueray and The Profligate. Eventually, the two were freed and the play was allowed to continue. The trial for Sapho and Nethersole began on 3 April 1900 and Nethersole and Revelle were acquitted on 7 April. The play was allowed to continue. The following year, 1901, he costarred with Mrs. Leslie Carter in "Du Barry".

Filmography

Doctor Antonio (1914)
The Last of the Caldieros (1914)*short
Hamlet (1914)
DuBarry (1915) w/Mrs. Leslie Carter
The Masque of Life (1915)
Cuore ed arte (1915)
An Enemy to Society (1915)
The Price of Malice (1916)
Monna Vanna (1916)
The Half Million Bribe (1916)
Ultima rappresentazione di gala del circo Wolfson (1916)
The Black Stork (1917)
Thais (1917) with Mary Garden
Lest We Forget (1918)
The Splendid Sinner (1918)
A Star Over Night (1919) *short
Kismet (1920) with Otis Skinner
 Good Women (1921)
The Telephone Girl (1927)

References

External links

 
 

1867 births
1958 deaths
Gibraltarians
British male film actors
British male stage actors